is a Japanese professional mixed martial artist, professional wrestler, actor and judoka, who is currently signed with DDT Pro-Wrestling and has fought and competed for World Victory Road, DREAM, Tokyo Joshi Pro-Wrestling, Pancrase, Pro Wrestling Wave, S-Cup, Shooto, Big Japan Pro Wrestling, Union Pro Wrestling, Kaientai Dojo, Dradition, Legend The Pro-Wrestling and K-1. Sakaguchi is known for his fight with Nigerian K-1 kickboxer, Film actor and male model Andy Ologun. Yukio is the son of former judoka and professional wrestling legend Seiji Sakaguchi and the older brother of actor Kenji Sakaguchi, who notably co-starred in Ikebukuro West Gate Park when the television show made its debut run in 2000 and most recently in 2012 started making regular appearances on the show Saigo Kara Nibanme no Koi, he also co-starred in the film Face.

In 2009 Yukio was featured in Kamui Gaiden; the film was a box office hit in Japan and the Netherlands. After positive reviews on Yukio's performance he was later chosen to play a small supporting role in the sequel to Ninja Assassin, set to be released in 2014, but never materialized after the project was put into development hell.

In October 2012 Sakaguchi signed a multi-fight deal with Pancrase and in January 2013 re-signed with DDT for the rest of that year. He is a former one-time KO-D Openweight Champion, two-time KO-D Tag Team Champion, eight-time KO-D 6-Man Tag Team Champions and the winner of the 2015 King of DDT tournament.

Professional wrestling career
Sakaguchi made his professional wrestling debut on March 22, 2012, when he defeated Michael Nakazawa at a Hard Hit event, a mixed martial arts inspired sub-brand of DDT Pro-Wrestling (DDT). He was then drafted as part of the New World Japan (nWJ) stable, and made his DDT main card debut on July 22, when he and stablemates Sanshiro Takagi and Soma Takao defeated Hikaru Sato, Michael Nakazawa and Tanomusaku Toba in a six-man tag team match, with Sakaguchi once again submitting Nakazawa for the win. On August 18, Sakaguchi took part in DDT's fifteenth anniversary event in Nippon Budokan, where he and Takao won a five-team gauntlet match. Sakaguchi continued representing nWJ until September 19, when the stable, along with all other stables in DDT, was forced to disband. Sakaguchi and Takagi, however, remained aligned and formed a new stable named "Real Outsiders", replacing Soma Takao with the returning Yoshiaki Yago, also a former member of the New World Japan stable. During late 2012, Sakaguchi also formed a regular partnership with Akito, after defeating him in a singles match on October 13. On January 13, 2013, Yukio made an appearance for the LEGEND The Pro-Wrestling promotion, teaming with Riki Choshu and Tatsumi Fujinami in a six-man tag team match, where they were defeated by Hiroyoshi Tenzan, Jyushin Thunder Liger and Masahiro Chono. Post-match Liger criticized Sakaguchi, claiming that he did not belong in the same ring with the five other men as he was "only" the son of Seiji Sakaguchi. This led to DDT putting together a match for its February 17 event, where Sakaguchi and Akito were defeated by Liger and his fellow New Japan Pro-Wrestling worker Hiromu Takahashi, with Takahashi pinning Akito for the win. Afterwards, Liger requested a singles match with Sakaguchi.

On March 20, Sakaguchi took part in the annual Right to Challenge Anytime, Anywhere Contract Battle Royal, winning the match by scoring the last elimination over Masa Takanashi and earning a shot at DDT's top title, the KO-D Openweight Championship. Following the win, Sakaguchi claimed that he had finally earned his spot in DDT. On April 13, Sakaguchi failed in his title challenge against the defending KO-D Openweight Champion Shigehiro Irie. The following day, Sakaguchi teamed with fellow mixed martial artist Hikaru Sato and defeated Fuma and Kudo in a tag team match to become the number one contenders to the KO-D Tag Team Championship. On May 3, Sakaguchi and Sato defeated Harashima and Yasu Urano to win the KO-D Tag Team Championship, Sakaguchi's first professional wrestling title. Sakaguchi and Sato made their first title defense against Monster Army members Hoshitango and Yuji Hino on June 2. Sato's and Sakaguchi's second successful title defense took place on June 14, when they defeated former champions Kudo and Yasu Urano. Post-match Sato, the de facto leader of the tag team, had mentioned that he wanted to start defending the title against younger wrestlers, and later nominated rookies Akito and Konosuke Takeshita as their next challengers. On June 23, Sato and Sakaguchi defeated Akito and Takeshita for their third successful title defense. Sakaguchi then made it to the semifinals of the annual King of DDT tournament, before losing to finalist Kenny Omega on July 7.

In mid-2013, Sakaguchi began feuding with the Monster Army stable, brought on by them stealing a gown and a statue belonging to his father Seiji. The rivalry culminated in an eight-man tag team match on August 17, during the first day of the Peter Pan weekend in Ryōgoku Kokugikan, where Sakaguchi, Akito, Kazuki Hirata and Masa Takanashi faced Monster Army members Antonio Honda, Daisuke Sasaki, Hoshitango and Yuji Hino. Sakaguchi submitted Honda for the win, following outside interference from his brother Kenji. The following day, Sakaguchi and Sato lost the KO-D Tag Team Championship to Isami Kodaka and Yuko Miyamoto. In late 2013, Sakaguchi was named the number one contender to the KO-D Openweight Championship, held by Harashima. En route to the title match, Sakaguchi submitted Harashima in a six-man tag team match on December 15 to win the Ironman Heavymetalweight Championship. On December 23, Sakaguchi failed in his KO-D Openweight Championship challenge against Harashima and, as a result, also lost the Ironman Heavymetalweight Championship back to him.

On March 2, Sakaguchi formed a new stable, later named Shuten-dōji, with Kudo and Masa Takanashi, based on the three's shared love of alcohol. On May 4, Shuten-dōji defeated Daisuke Sasaki, Kenny Omega and Kota Ibushi to win the KO-D 6-Man Tag Team Championship. They lost the title to Happy Motel (Antonio Honda, Konosuke Takeshita and Tetsuya Endo) in their second defense on July 13. Shuten-dōji, however, regained the title from Happy Motel just seven days later in a three-way match, which also included Team Drift (Keisuke Ishii, Shigehiro Irie and Soma Takao). They lost the title to Team Drift on August 17 at DDT's largest event of the year, Ryogoku Peter Pan 2014. On February 15, 2015, Shuten-dōji won the KO-D 6-Man Tag Team Championship for a record-tying third time, defeating previous champions Genpatsu Daio (Brahman Kei, Brahman Shu and Gorgeous Matsuno). Shuten-dōji then entered a series of matches with Team Drift, where the KO-D 6-Man Tag Team Championship changed hands between the two teams three times in six weeks with Shuten-dōji losing the title on March 1, winning it on March 21, and losing it again on April 11. On June 28, Sakaguchi defeated Konosuke Takeshita in the finals to win the 2015 King of DDT tournament. This led to Sakaguchi defeating stablemate Kudo on August 23 to win the KO-D Openweight Championship for the first time. He lost the title to Isami Kodaka on November 28. On December 11, 2016, Sakaguchi, Kudo and Takanashi defeated Damnation (Daisuke Sasaki, Mad Paulie and Tetsuya Endo) to win the KO-D 6-Man Tag Team Championship for the fifth time. On January 9, 2017, Sakaguchi and Masakatsu Funaki defeated Konosuke Takeshita and Mike Bailey to win the KO-D Tag Team Championship. On January 22, Sakaguchi, Kudo and Takanashi lost the KO-D 6-Man Tag Team Championship to Kazusada Higuchi, Kouki Iwasaki and Mizuki Watase in a three-way match, also involving Antonio Honda, Konosuke Takeshita and Trans-Am★Hiroshi. On April 29, Sakaguchi and Funaki lost the KO-D Tag Team Championship to Danshoku Dino and Yoshihiro Takayama in their third defense. On June 25, Sakaguchi, Kudo and Takanashi won the KO-D 6-Man Tag Team Championship for a record-tying sixth time by defeating NωA (Makoto Oishi, Mao and Shunma Katsumata). They were stripped of the title on October 10, when Kudo was sidelined with a concussion. Following Kudo's return, Shuten-dōji won the title for the seventh time by defeating All Out (Akito, Diego and Konosuke Takeshita) on December 10.

Championships and accomplishments

Professional wrestling
DDT Pro-Wrestling
Ironman Heavymetalweight Championship (6 times)
KO-D 6-Man Tag Team Championship (8 times) – with Kudo and Masa Takanashi/Masahiro Takanashi (7) and Kazusada Higuchi and Saki Akai (1) 
KO-D Openweight Championship (1 time)
KO-D Tag Team Championship (3 times) – with Hikaru Sato (1), Masakatsu Funaki (1) and Kazusada Higuchi (1)
King of DDT Tournament (2015)
One Night 6-Man Tag Team Tournament (2017) – with Kudo and Masahiro Takanashi
Right to Challenge Anytime, Anywhere Contract (2013)
Pro Wrestling Illustrated
PWI ranked him #285 of the top 500 singles wrestlers in the PWI 500 in 2016

Mixed martial arts record

|-
| Loss
| align=center| 6-7
| Takafumi Ito
| Submission (armbar)
| Pancrase 252: 20th Anniversary
| 
| align=center| 2
| align=center| 1:28
| Yokohama, Japan
| 
|-
| Win
| align=center| 6-6
| Jin Suk Jung
| Decision (unanimous)
| World Victory Road Presents: Soul of Fight
| 
| align=center| 2
| align=center| 5:00
| Tokyo, Japan
| Jacket Rules bout
|-
| Loss
| align=center| 5-6
| Kotetsu Boku
| KO (punch)
| Shooto: Revolutionary Exchanges 3
| 
| align=center| 1
| align=center| 1:54
| Tokyo, Japan
| 
|-
| Win
| align=center| 5-5
| Seung Hwa Han
| Submission (rear naked choke)
| Gladiator: Japan & Korea International Friendship Rally
| 
| align=center| 1
| align=center| N/A
| Okayama, Japan
| 
|-
| Loss
| align=center| 4-5
| Satoru Kitaoka
| Submission (achilles lock)
| Pancrase: Changing Tour 3
| 
| align=center| 1
| align=center| 1:26
| Tokyo, Japan
| 
|-
| Loss
| align=center| 4-4
| Andy Ologun
| KO (punches)
| Fields Dynamite!! 2008	
| 
| align=center| 1
| align=center| 3:52
| Saitama, Japan
| 
|-
| Win
| align=center| 4-3
| Yuichi Ikari
| KO (punch)
| Pancrase: Shining 9
| 
| align=center| 1
| align=center| 0:21
| Tokyo, Japan
| 
|-
| Win
| align=center| 3-3
| Masakazu Kuramochi
| KO (soccer kick)
| Pancrase: Shining 5
| 
| align=center| 1
| align=center| 2:01
| Tokyo, Japan
| 
|-
| Loss
| align=center| 2-3
| Wataru Takahashi
| Submission (armbar)
| Pancrase: Shining 3
| 
| align=center| 1
| align=center| 4:23
| Tokyo, Japan
| 
|-
| Loss
| align=center| 2-2
| Asaki Honda
| Submission (heel hook)
| Pancrase: Rising 8
| 
| align=center| 1
| align=center| 0:52
| Tokyo, Japan
| 
|-
| Win
| align=center| 2-1
| Ki Seok Choi
| Submission (rear naked choke)
| Pancrase: 2007 Neo-Blood Tournament Finals
| 
| align=center| 1
| align=center| 0:44
| Tokyo, Japan
| 
|-
| Loss
| align=center| 1-1
| Hyung Suk Choi
| KO (punch)
| Pancrase: Rising 4
| 
| align=center| 1
| align=center| 1:51
| Tokyo, Japan
| 
|-
| Win
| align=center| 1-0
| Akihiro Ono
| KO (knee)
| Pancrase: Blow 7
| 
| align=center| 2
| align=center| 2:47
| Tokyo, Japan
|

References

External links

Ameba personal blog  from Ameba
Pancrase profile  from Pancrase
DDT Pro-Wrestling profile 
SRC profile  from Sengoku Raiden Championship

MixedMartialArts.com profile

1973 births
Japanese civil engineers
Japanese male judoka
Japanese male karateka
Japanese male film actors
Japanese male professional wrestlers
Japanese male mixed martial artists
Japanese practitioners of Brazilian jiu-jitsu
Mixed martial artists utilizing Kyokushin kaikan
Mixed martial artists utilizing Shōrin-ryū
Mixed martial artists utilizing judo
Mixed martial artists utilizing wrestling
Mixed martial artists utilizing shootfighting
Mixed martial artists utilizing Brazilian jiu-jitsu
Lightweight mixed martial artists
Living people
Mixed martial arts trainers
Sasuke (TV series) contestants
Sportspeople from Tokyo
University of Tokyo alumni
20th-century professional wrestlers
21st-century professional wrestlers
Ironman Heavymetalweight Champions
KO-D 6-Man Tag Team Champions
KO-D Tag Team Champions
KO-D Openweight Champions